Capital lending is the process of a large company, or corporation, offering financing on large "ticket" items to encourage the customer to purchase that item. Many major corporations have set up finance divisions, or subsidiaries, to help the customer purchase their product over that of the competition. In addition, other companies have had to offer financing because their competitor does.

Capital lending, like its cousin consumer finance, was started by the automobile companies Ford Motor Company and General Motors (GM) in the late 1920s, and has spread to numerous industries around the globe. The difference between consumer finance and capital lending is that the consumer finance business is aimed at the retail consumer, while capital lending is directed more toward small businesses, farmers, fishermen, etc. — entities that are using the purchase for productive means. A capital asset, which will pay for itself, as opposed to a depreciating consumer product, which receives no tax credit, is not productive, and is only of benefit to the buyer. This financing is done on a wide range of products, from telephones, to copiers, to $200,000 combine harvesters by Deere & Company and CNH Global, or even larger and more expensive construction equipment from manufacturers like Caterpillar and Komatsu.

In the cases of companies like GM and General Electric the financial subsidiaries have become very large businesses in their own right.

Financial services